Clas Ohlson is a Swedish home improvement chain and mail-order firm that specialises in hardware, home, leisure, electrical and multimedia products. It is one of the biggest of its type in Scandinavia, with more than 230 Clas Ohlson stores as of May 2020. Stores also exist in Norway and Finland plus online presence in the United Kingdom and Germany through Amazon. Many of the products sold in the stores are own-label items. The company uses the house brands of Asaklitt (luggage and travel ware), Capere (bathroom supplies), Cocraft (DIY tools), Cotech (electrical tools), Coline (household electrical items), Exibel (household electrical items) and Clas Ohlson (all departments).

History 
The company was founded in 1918 by the technically minded  (1895–1979), as a mail order business based in the Swedish village of Insjön, Dalarna. Initially, only manuals and technical literature were sold, thus allowing people who lived in rural communities to obtain literature that would otherwise be unavailable. He opened his first shop in Insjön in 1926, but it was not until 1989, when the company opened a store in a shopping centre in central Stockholm, that it expanded into the retail business.

The first store outside Sweden was opened 1991 in Oslo in Norway and in 1999, the company was listed on the Stockholm Stock Exchange.

The first store in Finland was opened 2002 in Helsinki and in 2008, the company opened its first UK retail store in  Croydon, England (closed in 2018).

In 2014 the company entered a joint venture with Kuwait's Al Homaizi group. In May that year, the company opened the first Clas Ohlson branch outside Europe, a store in Dubai's Mirdif City Centre. It was, the Swedish company said, "a first step into the fast-growing Gulf Co-operation Council region".  The livestock-to-sportswear Al Homaizi group had in 1987 opened a flat-pack furniture store in Kuwait with Swedish retailer IKEA, under whose name the store traded. The Dubai branch later closed, with Clas Ohlson focusing on European expansion.

In 2016, Clas Ohlson continued its expansion by opening stores in Hamburg, Germany.

In 2018, Clas Ohlson started to shut all its stores in Germany and the United Kingdom (except from the Reading store, UK - being used as an online warehouse) as a result of their new strategy focusing more on the Nordic consumer. Today, Clas Ohlson operates online and physically in Norway, Sweden and Finland, and through Amazon in the United Kingdom and Germany.

In 2022, the Reading store closed ending the Company's presence in the UK except, apparently, on Amazon https://www.readingchronicle.co.uk/news/20711979.clas-ohlson-reading-store-finally-closes/

References

External links

About Clas Ohlson
Clas Ohlson Financial Reports 
 Executive report
Clas Ohlson Sweden
Clas Ohlson Finland
Clas Ohlson Norway
Clas Ohlson UK

Retail companies of Sweden
Home improvement companies
Hardware stores
Companies based in Dalarna County
Swedish companies established in 1918
Companies listed on Nasdaq Stockholm
Retail companies established in 1918